The men's 10,000 metres at the 1988 Summer Olympics in Seoul, South Korea had an entry list of 52 competitors, with two qualifying heats (52) before the final (20) took place on Monday September 26, 1988.

Through the halfway mark, Kipkemboi Kimeli was pushing the pace close to the world record, marked by Brahim Boutayeb.  Only Moses Tanui and trailing off the back Salvatore Antibo managed to stay in contact.  More than 60 metres back, Arturo Barrios led the chase pack.  As Tanui came up behind Boutayeb to tighten the lead group of three, Boutayeb went around Kimeli.  The two Kenyans ran together in chase for part of a lap then Tanui was unable to keep up with the accelerated pace.  Kimeli managed to keep close to Boutayeb but ever so slightly was losing ground.  As Tanui faded, Antibo accelerated to move himself into a stronger medal position.  By 5 laps to go, Antibo closed down on Kimeli.  The two were jockeying for the position, Antibo first sprinting past Kimeli, then Kimeli accelerating away from Antibo.  Boutayeb entered the last lap with a 20-metre lead and ran the last lap checking behind him.  Coming down the home stretch, realizing the world record was out of reach, he slowed the last 30 metres and celebrated, blowing kisses to the crowd.  Behind him, Antibo made one more move, sprinting around Kimeli, sprinting for home for the silver.  Kimeli was unable to respond and cruised home for bronze still more than eleven seconds up on Jean-Louis Prianon and the best sprinting efforts of the rest of the pack.

Medalists

Records
These were the standing world and Olympic records (in minutes) prior to the 1988 Summer Olympics.

The following Olympic record (in minutes) was set during this competition.

Final

Non-qualifiers

See also
 1987 Men's World Championships 10.000 metres (Rome)
 1990 Men's European Championships 10.000 metres (Split)
 1991 Men's World Championships 10.000 metres (Tokyo)

References

External links
  Official Report

 1
10,000 metres at the Olympics
Men's events at the 1988 Summer Olympics